is a 2018 Japanese supernatural horror film, based on the original novel of the same name, directed by Tetsuya Nakashima and starring Junichi Okada, Haru Kuroki, Nana Komatsu, Takako Matsu, and Satoshi Tsumabuki.

Plot
A couple must protect their 2-year-old daughter's life from a monster called Bogiwan.

Cast
 Junichi Okada as Kon Nosaki
 Nana Komatsu as Makoto Higa - Kon's girlfriend. She can communicate with ghosts.
 Satoshi Tsumabuki as Hideki Tahara
 Haru Kuroki as Kana Tahara - Hideki's wife
 Takako Matsu as Kotoko Higa - Makoto's elder sister. She also has psychic powers like her sister.
 Munetaka Aoki
 Rie Shibata
 Taiga
 Aiju Shida
 Miho Ninagawa
 Hikaru Ijūin
 Eri Ishida

References

External links
  
 

2018 films
2018 horror films
2010s monster movies
2010s supernatural horror films
Films set in Asia
Films set in Japan
Films set in Tokyo
Films based on Japanese novels
Japanese supernatural horror films
Paramount Pictures films
Toho films
2010s Japanese films
Films produced by Tomoya Nishino

Films directed by Tetsuya Nakashima